Cape Leeuwin  is the most south-westerly (but not most southerly) mainland point of the Australian continent, in the state of Western Australia.

Description 
A few small islands and rocks, the St Alouarn Islands, extend further in Flinders Bay to the east of the cape. The nearest settlement, north of the cape, is Augusta. South-east of Cape Leeuwin, the coast of Western Australia extends much further south. Cape Leeuwin is not the southernmost point of Western Australia, with that distinction belonging to West Cape Howe, which is to the southeast, near Albany. 
 
In Australia, the cape is considered where the Indian Ocean meets the Southern Ocean, but most other nations and bodies consider that the Southern Ocean exists only south of 60°S. 

Located on headland of the cape is the Cape Leeuwin Lighthouse and the buildings that were used by the lighthouse-keepers.

Cape Leeuwin is considered one of the three "great capes" of the world.

Use of name
Cape Leeuwin is often grouped with the next headland north, Cape Naturaliste, to identify the geography and ecology of the region. One example is in the name Leeuwin-Naturaliste National Park. Another is in the use of the phrases Cape to Cape or the Capes in tourist promotional materials. A shore base and a ship of the Royal Australian Navy have been named  after the cape.

History
The Wardandi, an Aboriginal Australian people, were the first peoples in the area. They called it "Doogalup".

The log of the Leeuwin has been lost, so very little is known of the voyage. However, the land found by the Leeuwin was recorded on a 1627 map by Hessel Gerritsz: Caert van't Landt van d'Eendracht ("Chart of the Land of Eendracht"), which appears to show the coast between present-day Hamelin Bay and Point D'Entrecasteaux. Cape Leeuwin itself cannot be recognised.

Other European vessels passed by for the next two centuries, including the Dutch , commanded by François Thijssen, in 1627 and the French Gros Ventre, under Louis Aleno de St Aloüarn, in 1772.

The first known European sighting of the cape was by Bruni d'Entrecasteaux in 1791. d'Entrecasteaux thought the cape was an island, and named it "Isle St Allouarn" ("St Allouarn Island"), in honour of Captain de St Aloüarn. Ten years later, Matthew Flinders began his survey of the South coast of New Holland from Cape Leeuwin in 1801 when he named it. Flinders landed in the bay to the east of Cape Leeuwin, today's Flinders Bay. Flinders was aware that the area had been known to the Dutch as "Leeuwin's Land".

The St Alouarn Islands is a group of islands off the tip of Cape Leeuwin.

Historic Precinct 

The lighthouse and adjacent buildings, and Cape Leeuwin water wheel are all within the historic precinct as reviewed by government management.

Climate
During the summer, the weather is warm, though there are usually sea breezes, and frequently sunny. The dry summers, coupled with strong winds, creates an environment where there is always a high risk of bush fires.

National park
The hillside to the west of the lighthouse, and the land nearby is now part of Leeuwin-Naturaliste National Park. It has extensive heath vegetation and thick scrub which supports a very high number of plant species and also bird species that utilise this habitat. The bay just east of Cape Leeuwin is Flinders Bay, named after Matthew Flinders, the circumnavigating explorer of the early 19th century.

Wrecks
Shipwrecks within sight of this location include , an iron-screw steamer built in Belfast in Northern Ireland, which sank after hitting an uncharted rock on a clear calm day in 1910.

He dived on the wreck to recover the lead that was being carried by the ship.

Some shipwrecks are identified as being within the vicinity of Augusta, Cape Leeuwin or Hamelin Bay that might not be within visual distance of the lighthouse.

In fiction
Cape Leeuwin is mentioned in the poem associated with the children's story The Sing-Song of Old Man Kangaroo by Rudyard Kipling. The poem is also the best way for outsiders to learn the cape's correct pronunciation; to rhyme with "flew in".

Notes

Further reading
 CALM/DOLA 1996. Land Management Series Map Sheet 1929-3 Leeuwin Edition 11:50000.
 (Edward Duyker (1987) The Dutch in Australia, AE Press, Melbourne.
 (Edward Duyker & Maryse Duyker, ed. & trans) (2001) Bruny d'Entrecasteaux: Voyage to Australia and the Pacific 1791—1793, Miegunyah/Melbourne University Press, Melbourne. 
 Edward Duyker,(2006) François Péron: An Impetuous Life: Naturalist and Voyager, Miegunyah/MUP, Melb. ,
 Eakin,Morgan (2003)Very Much on Watch - The Percy Willmott Photos Thornlie, W.A. Blackwood Publishing.

External links
 
 - List of WA lighthouses - check link to Cape Leeuwin

Leeuwin
 
Leeuwin-Naturaliste National Park